Perflubron (INN/USAN, or perfluorooctyl bromide; brand name Imagent) is a contrast medium for magnetic resonance imaging, computer tomography and sonography. It was approved for this use in the United States by the Food and Drug Administration in 1993.

Experimental research

Perflubron has also been tested experimentally for use in liquid breathing in premature infants with respiratory distress.

References 

MRI contrast agents
Organofluorides
Orphan drugs
Organobromides
Haloalkanes